Larry Sharpe may refer to:

Larry Sharpe (political activist) (born 1968), American business consultant and political activist 
Larry Sharpe (wrestler) (1951–2017), American professional wrestler